Lirularia discors is a species of sea snail, a marine gastropod mollusk in the family Trochidae, the top snails.

Description
The height of the shell attains 4.3 mm, its diameter also 4.3 mm.

Distribution
This species occurs in the Pacific Ocean off Baja California, Mexico.

References

External links
 To Encyclopedia of Life
 To ITIS
 To World Register of Marine Species

discors
Gastropods described in 1984